EUC Nord is the fusion of the technical schools in Hjørring and Frederikshavn, in Vendsyssel in Denmark. EUC is an abbreviation of Erhvervsuddannelsescenter, which means Vocational Education Center.

EUC Nord has six departments; four in Hjørring and two in Frederikshavn. In Hjørring there is both a HTX and a HHX departments beside the vocational educations. In Frederikshavn there is only an HTX department beside the vocational educations.

External links
 Official website
 HTX in Frederikshavn 

Secondary schools in Denmark
Vocational secondary education in Denmark
Hjørring
Frederikshavn